The Lane-Towers House is a historic home in Jacksonville, Florida. It is located at 3730 Richmond Street. On November 10, 1982, it was added to the U.S. National Register of Historic Places.

References

External links
 Duval County listings at National Register of Historic Places
 Duval County listings at Florida's Office of Cultural and Historical Programs

Houses in Jacksonville, Florida
History of Jacksonville, Florida
National Register of Historic Places in Jacksonville, Florida